Orangi Town lies in the northwestern part of the city that was named after the sprawling municipality of Orangi. Orangi Town was formed in 2001 as part of The Local Government Ordinance 2001, and was subdivided into 13 union councils. The town system was disbanded in 2011, and Orangi Town was re-organized as part of Karachi West District in 2015.

Location 
Orangi Town was bordered by New Karachi Town to the north across the Shahrah-e-Zahid Hussain, Gulberg Town to the east across the Gujjar Nala stream, Liaquatabad Town to the south, and SITE Town to the west. There were 13 residential neighborhoods, called union councils within Orangi Town.

History 
Orangi became famous in the 1980s when local inhabitants became frustrated at the lack of development in the area by the municipal administration and launched the Orangi Pilot Project under the guidance of Akhtar Hameed Khan. The Orangi area was the largest squatter settlement in Karachi at the time, so the Karachi Metropolitan Corporation (KMC) did not extend services to the Orangi community. The local community financed, designed and built their own low-cost sewerage system. 
 	
The federal government introduced local government reforms in the year 2000, which eliminated the previous "third tier of government" (administrative divisions) and replaced it with the fourth tier (districts). The effect in Karachi was the dissolution of the former Karachi Division in 2001, and the merging of its five districts to form a new Karachi City-District with eighteen autonomous constituent towns including Kemari Town. In 2011, the system was disbanded but remained in place for bureaucratic administration until 2015, when the Karachi Metropolitan Corporation system was reintroduced. In 2015, Kemari Town was re-organized as part of Karachi West district.

Localities within Orangi Town 
Gulshan-e-BaharBaloch GothBilal ColonyChisti NagarRaees Amrohi ColonyData NagarGhabool TownGhaziabadHanifabadHaryana ColonyIqbal Baloch ColonyMadina ColonyMohammad NagarMominabadMujahidabadChishti NagarToheed Colonysadiq abadIslam Chokdisco MorBaba Wilayat Ali shah ColonyFareed ColonyIslam NagarRaheem Shah Colony14-C15 number12 Number5 NumberMakhdoom Shah Colony1-KDabba MorAziz Nagar

See also 
 Akhtar Hameed Khan
 Khasa Hills
 Orangi Charitable Trust
 Orangi Nala
 Orangi Pilot Project

References

External links 
 Orangi Website

 
Squatting in Pakistan
Karachi West District
Towns in Karachi